The twin Op. 40 Polonaises of the Polonaise in A major, Op. 40, No. 1 (nicknamed the Military Polonaise) and the Polonaise in C minor, Op. 40, No. 2 were composed by Frédéric Chopin in 1838. The one in A major he originally intended to dedicate to Tytus Woyciechowski, but in the end Chopin placed Julian Fontana’s name as the dedicatee on both works.

Arthur Rubinstein remarked that the Polonaise in A major is the symbol of Polish glory, whilst the Polonaise in C minor is the symbol of Polish tragedy.

Polonaise in A major, Op. 40, No. 1 

The beginning opens with an A major chord and continues in a typical polonaise rhythm. The key then changes into D major in the middle of the polonaise for a trio section, after which the opening is repeated with no changes except disregarding the repeat signs. The piece is almost entirely played forte or louder.

During the September 1939 German invasion of Poland at the outset of World War II, Polskie Radio broadcast this piece daily as nationalistic protest, and to rally the Polish people.

The beginning of this piece is used as the interval signal for Polskie Radio.

It is used in the opening and closing credits of the film classic To Be or Not to Be (1942). This piece is played in the famous scene in the Polish film Ashes and Diamonds at the end of an all-night party celebrating the end of the war. In Season 3, episode 2 of Rectify, the closing credits roll to the A major Polonaise after Teddy is shown stalking Tawny, his estranged wife.

Polonaise in C minor, Op. 40, No. 2 

The second polonaise's main theme, a contrast to the majestic and joyful one in the first, features an even rhythm of quaver chords in the right hand starting with C minor, and a mournful melody played in octaves by the left, with occasional lines played by the right hand. It is interspersed with a more serene theme, before switching to the trio section in A♭ major, which incorporates typical polonaise rhythms. The main theme is then repeated but largely abridged, with an added dramatic melody in the right hand.

In Season 3 Episode 20 of Futurama, Bender plays the C minor Polonaise on a miniature piano while floating through space.

References

External links 
 
 Polonaises sheet music available at Musopen:

Polonaises by Frédéric Chopin
Polonaises
1838 compositions
Compositions in A major
Compositions in C minor